James Barry Norris (born 4 April 2003) is an English professional footballer who plays as a left-back for Premier League club Liverpool.

Club career
Norris made his professional debut for Liverpool whilst still a scholar on 17 December 2019, coming on as a substitute in the away match against Aston Villa in the quarter-finals of the EFL Cup.

International career
In September 2019, Norris started for the England under-17 team as they defeated hosts Poland to win the Syrenka Cup.

On 29 March 2021, Norris made his debut for England U18s during a 2-0 win away to Wales at the Leckwith Stadium.

On 6 September 2021, Norris made his debut for the  England U19s during a 1-1 draw with Germany in Bad Dürrheim.

Career statistics

Honours
Liverpool Academy
 Lancashire Senior Cup: 2021-22

References

External links

 
 
 
 

2003 births
Living people
Footballers from Liverpool
English footballers
England youth international footballers
Association football fullbacks
Liverpool F.C. players